Zhong Haihong (born 2 January 1978) is a Chinese female Paralympic sitting volleyball player. She contracted poliomyelitis when she was one year old.

As part of the China women's national sitting volleyball team, she competed at the 2004 and 2008 Summer Paralympics, winning both gold medals.

See also 
 China at the 2008 Summer Paralympics

References

External links 
 http://grfx.cstv.com/photos/schools/csno/genrel/auto_pdf/Volleyball.pdf

Living people
1978 births
Volleyball players at the 2008 Summer Paralympics
Volleyball players at the 2004 Summer Paralympics
Paralympic competitors for China
Chinese women's volleyball players
Volleyball players from Shanghai
Women's sitting volleyball players
Medalists at the 2004 Summer Paralympics
Medalists at the 2008 Summer Paralympics
Paralympic gold medalists for China
People with polio
Chinese sitting volleyball players
Paralympic medalists in volleyball